The DD class (later reclassified into D1, D2 and D3 subclasses) was a passenger and mixed traffic steam locomotive that ran on Victorian Railways from 1902 to 1974. Originally introduced on mainline express passenger services, they were quickly superseded by the much larger A2 class and were relegated to secondary and branch line passenger and goods service, where they gave excellent service for the next fifty years. The DD design was adapted into a 4-6-2T tank locomotive for suburban passenger use, the DDE (later D4) class. They were the most numerous locomotive class on the VR, with a total of 261 DD and 58  locomotives built.

History
By 1900, Victoria's express passenger locomotive fleet was almost exclusively made up of 4-4-0 designs of the Old A, New A, and the most recent AA class. These locomotives reflected contemporary British locomotive practice (as did the VR's fleet of 0-6-0 goods locomotives), in no small part due to the Victorian Government having appointed, in 1884, a Midland Railway manager, Richard Speight, as its first Chief Railways Commissioner. The commissioners then asked British locomotive engineer Edward Jeffreys to design five standard types of locos, in partnership with the British locomotive manufacturer (Kitson & Company of Leeds).

At the turn of the century, in what marked a major shift in policy, the recently-appointed VR Commissioner, John Mathieson, set up a Locomotive Design Section for in-house development of future motive power. The DD class locomotives were the first product of this exercise. A 4-6-0 design equipped with 5 ft 1 in driving wheels, saturated steam boiler and Belpaire firebox, the DD reflected the considerable talent of VR's design team, which included ex-Beyer, Peacock & Company recruit Eugene Siepen, future VR Chief Mechanical Engineer Alfred Smith, and Rolling Stock Branch manager Thomas Woodroffe.

Production
The first DD was number 560, constructed at the Victorian Railways' Newport Workshops and entering service in 1902. It was followed by engines 582 to 700, evens only, all constructed at Newport with the exception of 602, 604, 606, 608, 610, 632 and 634. These seven engines were notable as the last locomotives to be built by Ballarat's Phoenix Foundry, which had been the main supplier of locomotives to the VR for over thirty years. That was because the conservative Irvine government sought to reduce the costs of locomotive construction, and Newport Workshops was asked to tender for the construction of the DD class locomotives. A fierce tender war between Newport and Phoenix eventually resulted in a Royal Commission, which found that Newport could produce a locomotive for £3,364, some £497 cheaper than the Phoenix Foundry. Phoenix produced just seven DD locomotives and received no further orders, going into voluntary liquidation a year later.

Engines 702 to 796, again evens only, were delivered as tank engines of the  class up to the end of 1910. By this point the odds/evens locomotive numbering scheme had been abandoned, so the last nine of the batch were delivered as 701-717 to start filling gaps.

As part of the competitive tendering process, in early 1912 contracts were signed with each of Beyer, Peacock & Company of Manchester, England, Baldwin Locomotive Works of the USA, Walkers Limited of Maryborough, Queensland and Austral Otis, to compare against the cost of building engines at Newport Workshops. Ritchie Brothers of Sydney had also tendered but failed to win any of the orders. The contracts were for 20 engines each, with rights to a 20-engine extension and the possibility of up to a total of 100 engines. Respectively, Beyer, Peacock & Company delivered engines 531-569, Baldwin delivered 571-609 and Newport 611-649 (plus tank engine 719) in 1912. The following year saw Walkers delivered 651-689 while Newport supplied tank engines 721-749. Austral Otis encountered difficulties and withdrew from the contract in November 1912, leading to that contract being re-offered.

From 1914 newly delivered engines were consecutively numbered. Between 1914 and 1919 Newport delivered three batches of 20 engines each, numbered 873-912, 943-962 and 1013-1032, at a rate of 20 per year except the final two, delivered in 1918 and 1919 respectively.

The firm Thompsons & Co successfully won the contract for the 20 engines not being constructed by Austral Otis, and these were delivered from the end of 1914 numbered 893-912. A repeat order was placed in 1916 with deliveries of 963-982, and work had started on a further 20 engines when pressures of World War I led to the firm abandoning the remainder of the DD contract extensions. The parts already constructed were forwarded to Victorian Railways workshops, initially with five each being built at Bendigo and Ballarat (1033-1037 and 1038-1042 respectively), and the next ten were split between Newport (1043-1046), Bendigo (1047-1049) and Ballarat (1050-1052). These three workshops turned out virtually all subsequent locomotives for the Victorian railway system until the post-war era. (Some references exist to a further ten Thompsons engines, but no evidence is available to support the claim.)

Regular service
DD class locomotives were initially assigned to hauling the Adelaide Express over the steep gradients between Melbourne and Ballarat, but were soon seen on mainline passenger services on a number of lines.

The first years of the 20th century saw on the VR (as elsewhere in the world) a considerable increase in both the amount of traffic and the size and weight of rolling stock being hauled. In 1907, the DD class was supplanted by the much larger and more powerful A2 class on principal mainline services. However, with their light axle load (just 12 t 10 cwt in their original form), they were quickly reassigned to the VR's branchline network, where they became a fixture for the next fifty years.

From July until September 1918, 1032 was loaned to the South Australian Railways for trails against a Rx class operating from Adelaide to Murray Bridge and Victor Harbor.

Commissioner's Engines
With their light axle load and express passenger speed, the DD was also an ideal choice as motive power for the Victorian Railways Commissioner's train (used to carry the VR Commissioners on inspection tours to every corner of the VR network). In January 1917, Commissioners' locomotive No. 100, a 2-4-0 built in 1872, was scrapped and replaced with the brand new DD 980 from Thompsons Foundry in Castlemaine. It was later renumbered DD 718, DD 600 and D1 600, until March 1937 when it was placed into normal service as D1 576, operating until 1959. There is photographic evidence of D1 600 as Commissioners' Engine throughout the 1930s in the K.V. Scott collection. The new Commissioners engine from 1937 was D3 683, specially fitted with an electric headlight (Mort Clark Bulletin Article) and in August 1950 it was replaced by D3 639. 639 herself was withdrawn in July 1956 and replaced with D3 658, however 639's numbers were transferred to 658. D3 639 (658) was replaced by new 40 M.P.H, Clyde EMD diesel-electric Y 123 in January 1964. In August 1968 new diesel-electric Y 175 geared for 60 M.P.H. running took over until the Commissioners' Train was discontinued about 1979/80. In 1983 new Chief General Manager Mr. John Hearsch reinstated the Inspection Train with Clyde diesel-electric T 410. The Inspection train was discontinued after Hearsch left for Queensland Rail circa 1991.

DDE tank engine

The expansion of Melbourne's population into new suburbs early in the 20th century and the delay of the suburban electrification project saw the need for faster and more powerful steam locomotives for the suburban rail network. The basic design of the DD was in 1908 adapted into a 4-6-2T tank locomotive, classed . They were put to work on longer and hillier suburban routes such as the Dandenong, Frankston, Upper Ferntree Gully, Williamstown, Werribee, Lilydale, Darling and Kew railway lines. A total of 58 were built between 1908 and 1913.

However, only two were modified in this way. Ten were scrapped in 1924, followed by another four in 1925 and the sale of  704 to the State Electricity Commission of Victoria. The remaining  locomotives remained in service on non-electrified outer suburban routes or found new roles as suburban goods locomotives or shunters. Some were allotted to Ballarat to work the short branch line to Newlyn.

Design improvements
During the construction of the DD class, a number of changes were made. The first locomotives built featured low running plates with splashers over the driving wheels and a narrow cab. However, after 26 such examples were built the design was altered with high running plates mounted above the driving wheels and a more comfortable full-width pressed metal cab of Canadian design, a feature incorporated at the request of Victorian Railways Chief Commissioner and former Canadian Pacific Transportation Manager Thomas Tait. These became hallmarks of all subsequent VR steam locomotive designs.

Although the Dd was considered to be a successful design, it had a key shortcoming in that its boiler performance was not sufficient for the traffic demands being placed on it. In 1914, an experimental superheater was fitted to DD 882 and was found to be very successful. Both DD and A2 designs (both locomotive classes still under construction at the time) were modified with superheated boilers (with all of the existing A2 class locomotives eventually fitted with superheated boilers). Superheaters were also fitted to three of the  locomotives.  Further DD locomotives were also built with 19 in. diameter cylinders in place of the original 18 in. cylinders.

In 1923-4, DD 1022 was experimentally fitted with Pulverised Brown Coal (PBC) burning equipment.

Reclassing: D1, D2 and D4 class
In 1922 a complex renumbering and reclassing of VR locomotives saw the DD class split into two subclasses, the D1 class (comprising all the original saturated steam locomotives with 18 in. cylinders) and the D2 class (comprising superheated locomotives with either 18 or 19 in. cylinders).

With the introduction of a further D3 class in 1929, the  tank locomotives were reclassified as D4 class in 1929.

The D3 class

Despite the success of superheating the DD boiler, it was still somewhat limited in steam-raising capabilities. In 1922, a new design of 2-8-0 branch line goods locomotive, the K class, was introduced, with noticeably superior boiler performance to that of the DD. In 1929, a DD class locomotive was rebuilt with a larger boiler derived from the K class design. Based on the success of the rebuild, a further 93 D1or D2 class locomotives were converted between 1929 and 1947, and classified D3.

The D3s were economical and efficient, but also renowned for their superior performance. They could be worked hard and were a favourite with crews.

With its low axle load and its ability to travel at a relatively high speed, the D3 helped to speed up passenger services on many lightly laid branch lines.

Conversions and Renumberings
In the period 1922-1927 well over half the fleet of DD engines were renumbered, some twice, to clean up the mess left behind by the former odds/evens system and group engines of the same design into a consecutive series. In 1922 the proposed range was 490-799 for the Dd engines and 250-269 for the s, although in practice the ranges ended up as 500-799 and 250-287 with many numbers unfilled. Note the total of these groups would have been 350 engines, against 319 actually built. During this period two of the  engines were converted to tender engines, one sold and a further 17 scrapped.

In 1929 the DD series was further segregated into D1, D2 and D3 taking slots 500-645, 700-799 and 638-699 respectively. The first of the latter was D1 542 to D3 685 in 1929, followed by further examples of the D3 upgrade completed in 1930 to give the number range 675-689 and this was further extended to 670-699 by the end of 1932. Later conversions between 1933 and 1946 counted down from 669 to 607 in 1946, and finally 604 ex D2 717 entering service in 1947. It is not clear which, if any, engines were intended to take the slots of D3 605 or 606. Otherwise, the DD group was reclassed as either D1 or D2 as appropriate, for the most part without renumbering. Unlike with other renumbering projects, engines converted to D3 and renumbered did not have their previous slots immediately filled.

In 1951, to make way for new J and R Class engines being ordered under Operation Phoenix, the remaining D1 and D2 engines were renumbered to the range 561-579 and 580-604 respectively, with D3 604 changing to 606. At the time, engines D1 573, 578, 579 and 585 were still in service and retained their numbers, leaving gaps at numbers 575, 577, 583, 602 and 605. Assuming 585 would have been renumbered to replace D1 572 withdrawn that year, the remaining open slots in each group correspond to the number of engines withdrawn in 1951.

Engine renumbering histories
These tables are based on:
 Cave, N., Buckland, J. & Beardsell, D. (2002) Steam Locomotives of the Victorian Railways - Volume 1 The First Fifty Years, Australian Railway Historical Society (Victorian Division), 
 Medlin, P. N. (2004) Victorian Railways Locomotives by Number (self-published, based on Victorian Railways' locomotive repair cards)
 ARHS Bulletin No 167, September 1951, page 115

DD Engines

Engines

Demise
Scrapping of DD class locomotives commenced as early as 1927 when DD 712 was wrecked, followed by D1 535 in 1928. A full 20 engines (including the newest of the fleet, DD 1052) were scrapped in 1929 as newer K and N class locomotives took over branch line goods services and Petrol Electric Rail Motors started to replace mixed trains and locomotive-hauled branch line passenger services. The unrebuilt saturated steam D1 class locomotives were the first to go, and by 1951 no fewer than 120 had been scrapped.

By 1951, the remaining D1 locomotives were shunters, the D2 locomotives providing suburban goods and branch line goods and passenger service, and the D3 performing both branch line and mainline service. However, with the massive postwar upgrading of the VR locomotive fleet as part of 'Operation Phoenix' came the introduction of J class 2-8-0 branch line steam locomotives and T class (EMD G8) diesel electric locomotives to replace the various remaining DD locomotives.

The first D3 locomotive to be scrapped was none other than Commissioner's locomotive D3 639 in July 1956. However, this locomotive had attained sufficient prestige that its brass fittings and number plates were transferred to another locomotive, D3 658, which took over its role as Commissioner's locomotive and its identity as "D3 639".

Withdrawals and scrappings continued throughout the 1950s and 60s. The last DD in VR service was the Commissioner's locomotive D3 639 (formerly D3 658), which was replaced in this role by a Y class (EMD G6B) diesel electric locomotive, Y 123 from January 1964, then Y175 from August 1968. However, D3 639 had since October 1964 taken on a new role providing motive power for the ARHS 'Vintage Train' as the first 'Special Trains Vintage Engine', and continued in this popular role until deteriorated boiler condition saw it finally withdrawn from service in 1974.

Preservation

Operational
D3 639 was restored to operating condition in 1984 and was recommissioned into service by Prime Minister Bob Hawke on 17 November 1984. Since this date, it has continued in service hauling various rail enthusiast special trains. It has also been used in a number of films, and could be seen hauling passenger trains beneath an inoperable overhead catenary in the 2000 remake of the post-apocalyptic film On the Beach.

From 5 December 1970 the engine was painted red with black undergear and a brass dome, and by the Austeam '88 festival it had been named "Spirit of Ballarat". As a rebuild of a 1903 DD locomotive, it made a special long-distance journey to Mildura in 2002 as that line approached its centenary, and celebrated its own 100th anniversary in 2003 with a journey to Swan Hill. Between 2007 and 2009 the engine operated with its previous number of 658.

In 2014 the engine masqueraded as DD 893 for the centenary of the Thompsons Foundry in Castlemaine. While most of its fittings were retained for the day, the number, letter and builders plates were swapped for the occasion. Notably, the first DD built by Thompsons was in fact preserved, having been converted to D3 640 in 1937 then renumbered D3 688 in 1964. It is displayed on a plinth in Swan Hill, and more recently returned to its previous 640 identity.

Static
A single example of each of the D2 (604) and D4 (268) locomotives were retained for preservation and today are preserved at the Newport Railway Museum, where they are displayed along with D3 635. Notably, 604 is coupled to a tender consisting of a D2 tank on a slightly longer A2 frame.

13 other D3 class locomotives remain, either preserved in static display or stored awaiting restoration or as a supply of parts.

No original D1 class locomotives have survived into preservation.

Model railways

HO scale
Broad Gauge Models has in the past released HO scale brass kits for the D3 series of locomotives, while Prescision Scale Models has produced complete, painted models of the engine both in typical Victorian Railways condition, and D3 639 as preserved circa 1988.

In 2017 Trainbuilder announced an intent to produce complete, ready-to-run, DCC-ready models of D3 639 in three variants, 620, 658, 676, 683 and 698 in black, and 619 with shunters' steps along the sides of the driving wheels.

Phoenix Reproductions is working on a ready-to-run plastic D3 locomotive due to be released in early 2020, sharing some components with the Eureka Models K Class model. Units include 624, 625, 632, 635, 655, 664, 669, 674, 683, 684 and 690 in plain black, 639 and 688 in black with red lining, and 639 in the Canadian Red scheme circa 1988 (with red dome). These units represent various periods, based on the type of pilot and the location of the turbo-generator. Pilots were generally of the bar type until the late 1940s, replaced with the plate type until the early 1960s when they were removed. Turbo-generators were installed above the firebox until the early 1950s when many engines (but not all) had them shifted to the footplate. The black-and-red model of D3 639 may be a reasonable representation of either the period 1950-1967 or 2011–present, based on the red lining.

O scale
Veteran Models has an etched O scale brass kit for the D3 (VM11) with a choice of a riveted (VM31) or welded (VM10) tender.

References

External links 
 Locomotives - Beyer, Peacock & Co p . 43

Baldwin locomotives
Beyer, Peacock locomotives
Railway locomotives introduced in 1902
Dd class
4-6-0 locomotives